Sikke'n familie is a 1963 Danish family film based upon the play by Ian Hay and directed by Jon Iversen and Alice O'Fredericks.

Plot
The Winter family and maid are jewel thieves in London. It's a hobby to the dad. The son is more into counterfeiting money. The family is shocked by the son working in a bank and going straight.

Cast
Jørgen Beck as Politiinspektør John Stoke
Bent Børgesen as Ronny Blackmore
Charlotte Ernst as Caroline Winther
Judy Gringer as Maggie
Lone Hertz as Victoria Stoke
Gunnar Lauring as James Winther
Ib Mossin as Bill Johnson
Lisbeth Movin as Kvinde, hos hvem der bliver begået indbrud
Baard Owe as Peter Winther
Poul Reichhardt as Sam Jackson
Jessie Rindom as Ellinor Winther
Karl Stegger as Pastor Tittaton

External links

1963 films
1960s Danish-language films
Danish black-and-white films
Films directed by Jon Iversen
Films directed by Alice O'Fredericks
Films scored by Sven Gyldmark
ASA Filmudlejning films
Films based on works by Ian Hay